The Great Western Railway (GWR) 2251 Class or Collett Goods Class  was a class of 0-6-0 steam tender locomotives designed for medium-powered freight. They were introduced in 1930 as a replacement for the earlier Dean Goods 0-6-0s and were built up to 1948.

Overview 

In many ways, the 2251s were modernised Dean Goods, sharing the main dimensions, but having more modern features such as taper boilers and full cabs. Increases in both boiler pressure and heating surface gave a useful increase in power at the expense of weight that restricted permitted routes. Numbers 2211–2230, built in 1940 did not have side windows. Designed by Charles Collett for medium freight and passenger duties they had  driving wheels. They could be found operating on most parts of the former GWR system.
These were the first GWR 0-6-0 to use the standard number 10 boiler as later fitted to the 94xx, 15xx and various rebuilds of absorbed mainly Welsh locomotives.

No. 3217, delivered December 1947, was the last locomotive built by the GWR. Nos. 3218 and 3219 were delivered in January 1948, the first locomotives built at Swindon for British Railways.

They were withdrawn between 1958 and 1965.

Preservation 

One, 3205, has been preserved and is located on the South Devon Railway in Devon. While the engine has spent most of its preserved life running on heritage railways including the Severn Valley Railway, West Somerset Railway & then the Dart Valley Railway (before renaming to the SDR). For a very brief one-off appearance the engine made a mainline appearance at the Rocket 150 celebrations in 1980. The engine arrived at the event and then later departed for home under its own power.

As of 2022 the engine is stored awaiting an overhaul following early withdrawal in 2017, the ticket having expired in 2020.

Models
Bachmann Branchline manufactures models of the 2251 in OO gauge. Mainline (Palitoy) released the first ready-to-run OO model in 1978. The Bachmann model was released in 1996. It is based on the Mainline model with revised body tooling to complement a completely new chassis design that allows the boiler backhead to be modelled.

In N gauge, the first model was the langley whitemetal kit, designed to fit the Graham Farish 94xx/general purpose tank chassis.  The next was the Peco (model railroads) ready to run model.  This was a big step forward, and was DCC fitted as standard.  Production of these stopped around 2010.  The next model of the class was made by Union Mills, and was released in 2017.

In 3mm/TT scale, BEC produced a whitemetal kit body for the Tri-ang LMS Fowler Class 3F chassis, though this is long discontinued.

References

External links 

 Great Western Archive – Introduction to 2251 Class
 Great Western Archive – Shed allocations, build and withdrawal dates
 Class 2251 Details at Rail UK
 Heritage Railways Loco Database – entry for no. 3205

0-6-0 locomotives
2251 Class
Railway locomotives introduced in 1930
Freight locomotives
Standard gauge steam locomotives of Great Britain
C h2 locomotives